The Prussian Staff College, also Prussian War College was the highest military facility of the Kingdom of Prussia to educate, train, and develop general staff officers.

Location
It originated with the Akademie für junge Offiziere der Infanterie und Kavallerie (Academy for young officers of the infantry and cavalry) in 1801, later becoming known as the Allgemeine Kriegsschule (General War-School). It was officially re-founded by Gerhard von Scharnhorst in Berlin on October 15, 1810 as one of three officer colleges.  Its building on Unter den Linden (1845/25), Berlin,  was designed by Karl Friedrich Schinkel.

Graduation
Graduating from the Staff College was a prerequisite for appointment to the Prussian General Staff (later the German General Staff). Carl von Clausewitz enrolled as one of its first students in 1801 (before it was renamed), while other attendees included Field Marshals von Steinmetz, von Moltke, and von Blumenthal in the 1820s and 1830s.

Ernst Emile Von Lorenz, who served as a United States Army Commander in 1889, was a graduate, as was US Army Colonel Albert Coady Wedemeyer, who served in World War II.  The Staff College restructured after World War I and dissolved following World War II.

Curriculum
Students at the War Academy attended about 20 hours of lectures per week. Instruction was by professors from Berlin University and officers serving on the Great General Staff, who thereby enhanced their own educations. In 1872 the War Academy was taken from the Inspector of Military Education and placed under the Chief of the General Staff. The spirit of the Academy was articulated by Chief of Staff Helmuth von Moltke, who emphasized the importance "of an active process of mental give and take between teacher and pupils, so as to stimulate the pupils to become fellow-workers".

Admission to the Academy was highly selective. Officers with at least five years service who wanted to become General Staff officers prepared themselves for the entrance examination, which included tactics, surveying, geography, mathematics and French, with questions set to test understanding rather than rote memory. The graders of the essays did not know the names or regiments of the candidates. From hundreds of applicants, about one hundred were accepted every year to enter the first-year course at the Academy. Those who performed satisfactorily were promoted to the second and third year.

In the first year, fourteen hours of lectures each week were focused on military subjects, including military history, while seventeen hours were non-military, which included general history, mathematics, science and a choice of French or Russian. Roughly the same time allocations were used in the last two years. Lectures were supplemented by visits to fortifications, arms factories and exercises of the railway regiment. During the three month summer breaks the students attended manoeuvres and were taken on field tactical exercises in which they commanded imaginary units. At the end of the course they took their second examination. Only about thirty students passed this extremely difficult test. They were then assigned (kommandiert) to the Great General Staff, while retaining their regimental attachments. After two years they took their third and final examination, after which five to eight officers were permanently posted to fill vacancies in the General Staff  a remarkable winnowing from the many who had entered the competition.

See also 
 Bundeswehr Command and Staff College established in 1957 as the successor of the Prussian Military Academy
Command and General Staff College -- United States
Staff College, Camberley  -- United Kingdom
General Staff Academy -- Imperial Russia
Army War College -- Imperial Japan
École Supérieure de Guerre -- France
List of government-run higher-level national military academies

References

Staff colleges
1810 establishments in Germany
Military academies of Germany
Military of Prussia
Defunct military academies